José Marçal da Silva Lago (born 20 August 1993 in Fafe) is a Portuguese footballer who plays for São Martinho, as a goalkeeper.

Club career
On 6 August 2016, Marçal made his professional debut with Fafe in a 2016–17 LigaPro match against Braga B.

References

External links

Stats and profile at LPFP 

1993 births
Living people
People from Fafe
Portuguese footballers
Association football goalkeepers
Liga Portugal 2 players
Segunda Divisão players
AD Fafe players
A.D. Camacha players
S.C. Vila Real players
A.R. São Martinho players
Sportspeople from Braga District